Dominic Burke ( – 1649) was an Irish Dominican priest and political agent. 

Dominic or Dominick Burke may also refer to:

 Dominic Burke (bishop) (died 1704), Irish Roman Catholic Bishop of Elphin from 1671 to 1704
 Dominick Burke (died 1747), Irish politician
 Dominic Burke (businessman) (born 1958), British businessman